RWO may refer to:

RWO Alzey, a German football club from the city of Alzey, Rhineland-Palatinate
Rwo language, a dialect of the West Kilimanjaro language
Real world object in VMDS
Ministerie van Ruimtelijke Ordening, Woonbeleid en Onroerend Erfgoed (Ministry of Spatial Planning, Housing Policy and Heritage sites), a Flemish Government organization that supports the Minister of Culture on policy decisions
Real World Operation, in European Maritime Force